The Bitoujiao Lighthouse or Pitou Chiao Lighthouse is a lighthouse at Bitou Cape in Ruifang District, New Taipei, Taiwan.

History

The lighthouse was originally built by the Japanese in 1897. In 1971, it was repaired due to damages caused by World War II.

Architecture
The lighthouse is a white concrete round tower with a height of 12.3 meters.

See also

 List of tourist attractions in Taiwan
 List of lighthouses in Taiwan

References

External links

 Maritime and Port Bureau MOTC

1897 establishments in Taiwan
Lighthouses completed in 1897
Lighthouses in New Taipei